Tonga competed at the 2017 Asian Indoor and Martial Arts Games held in Ashgabat, Turkmenistan from September 17 to 27. Tonga sent a delegation consisting of 9 competitors in the multi-sport event and the nation finished the competition without receiving any medals.

Tonga made its debut in an Asian Indoor and Martial Arts Games for the first time at the Games held in Turkmenistan along with other Oceania nations.

Participants

References 

2017 in Tongan sport
Nations at the 2017 Asian Indoor and Martial Arts Games